Großer Weißer See is a lake in Mecklenburgische Seenplatte, Mecklenburgische Seenplatte, Mecklenburg-Vorpommern, Germany.

Lakes of Mecklenburg-Western Pomerania
LGrosserWeisserSee